The Jack Layton Ferry Terminal (formerly called the Toronto Island Ferry Docks) is the ferry slip for Toronto Island ferries operated by the City of Toronto Parks, Forestry and Recreation Division. Three ferry routes provide transportation between mainland Toronto and Centre Island, Hanlan's Point and Ward's Island in the Toronto Islands, with levels of service to each destination differing depending on time of year. The terminal is located in the Toronto Harbour, behind the Westin Harbour Castle Hotel and adjacent to Harbour Square Park. It is south of Bay Street and Queens Quay in Toronto, Ontario, Canada.

The Toronto Island Ferry Docks were renamed the Jack Layton Ferry Terminal in 2013 to honour Jack Layton, who served as a Toronto city councillor, and was later leader of the New Democratic Party (NDP) and leader of the Official Opposition.

History
The main departure point from the city to the Island has been at the foot of Bay Street since the 19th century.

First terminal location (19th century–1918)

The original terminal was located on the east side of the Toronto Harbour Commission Building at Bay and Harbour Streets. The terminal in the picture was destroyed by fire in 1907 and was rebuilt. A steamship terminal and berth areas was added to the east side. The site is now filled in and occupied by a parking lot.

Second terminal location (1918–1972)
When the infilling of the harbour took place after 1918 the docks moved to Queen's Quay west of Bay Street. It had a waiting room and was heated in the wintertime. This terminal would be there until it was demolished during the redevelopment of the Toronto waterfront that began in the 1970s. The Harbour Square condos are built on the site.

Third terminal location (1972–present)

The third terminal opened in January 1972, shifted about 100 metres to the east. The new terminal was part of a planned 85 million dollar waterfront project started in 1964, and completed in the early 1970s at the cost of 250 million dollars that would see the Bay Street shipping slip filled in and Harbour Castle Hilton and Harbour Square condos built. The cost of the new terminal was  But unlike the previous terminal, no waiting room was provided (as the ferries stopped operating during winter time), and had crowding problems starting in its first season. Metro Parks Commissioner Tommy Thompson would have liked to see the new terminal right at the foot of Bay Street, where the old one was, but it was placed where it was to be part of the condo-hotel complex. Minor upgrades have been made to replace the original ticket booths with newer and larger ones located just north of the original entrance and partially covered by a canopy.

In 2012, the Toronto City Council voted unanimously to rename the terminal in honour of the late Jack Layton, who served as a Toronto city councillor, and led the NDP and Official Opposition. In 2013, on the second anniversary of Layton's death, the terminal was formally renamed and a bronze statue of Layton riding on a tandem bicycle was installed at the site.

New Terminal
In 2015, a winning design was announced for a renovation and redesign of the terminal building. The first phase of construction is expected to be complete in April, 2019.

Usage
There is an estimated 1.2 million passengers to the station per year, mostly in the summer months.

The three larger ferries are stored here during the winter months. The ferries' exposed decks are covered by a white tarp.

References

See also

 Queens Quay station
 Toronto Ferry Company

Ferry terminals in Canada
Water transport in Toronto
Brutalist architecture in Canada
Toronto Islands
Transport buildings and structures in Ontario